Fitzroy Dearborn was an American publisher of academic library reference titles with offices in London and Chicago. It was acquired by Taylor & Francis as an imprint of Routledge Reference in 2002, before Taylor & Francis merged with Informa.

At the time of its sale, the company had a backlist of 350 titles.

History 
Fitzroy Dearborn Publishers was founded in 1994 by Daniel Kirkpatrick and George Walsh. The company was a publisher of academic library reference titles with offices in London and Chicago. It was acquired by the UK-based Taylor & Francis Group as an imprint of Routledge Reference in 2002. Taylor & Francis itself subsequently merged with Informa.

At the time of its sale, the company had a backlist of 350 titles, many of them award-winning.

Name 
The name of the company was derived from the districts of London and Chicago in which its offices were located, Fitzrovia and Dearborn respectively.

Titles 
Fitzroy Dearborn's titles included:
Dictionary of Artists' Models. 
Dictionary of Women Artists. 
Encyclopedia of African History
Encyclopedia of AIDS. 
Encyclopedia of Comparative Iconography. 
Encyclopedia of the Essay. 
Encyclopedia of Greece and the Hellenic Tradition. 
Encyclopedia of Historians and Historical Writing. 
Encyclopedia of Indo-European Culture. 
Encyclopedia of Interior Design. 
Encyclopedia of Life Writing. 
Encyclopedia of Literary Translation into English. 
Encyclopedia of Mexico. 
Encyclopedia of Monasticism. 
Encyclopedia of the Novel. 
Encyclopedia of the Palestinians. 
Encyclopedia of Sculpture. 
Encyclopedia of Television. 
International Book Publishing An Encyclopedia. 
Jewish Writers of the Twentieth Century. 
Reader's Guide to American History. 
Reader's Guide to the History of Science. 
Reader's Guide to Lesbian and Gay Studies 
Reader's Guide to Literature in English. 
Reader's Guide to Military History. 
Reader's Guide to the Social Sciences. 
Reference Guide to Russian Literature.

References

External links 
fitzroydearborn.com

Book publishing companies of the United Kingdom
Book publishing companies of the United States
Publishing companies established in 1994
1994 establishments in Illinois